Dren is a village in Municipality of Prilep.

Demographics
As of the 2021 census, Dren had 10 residents with the following ethnic composition:
Macedonians 9
Persons for whom data are taken from administrative sources 1

According to the 2002 census, the village had a total of 10 inhabitants. Ethnic groups in the village include:
Macedonians 10

References

Villages in Prilep Municipality